1499 Pori, provisional designation , is a stony Eunomian asteroid from the central regions of the asteroid belt, approximately 15 kilometers in diameter. It was discovered on 16 October 1938, by Finnish astronomer Yrjö Väisälä at the Turku Observatory in southwest Finland. The asteroid was named after the Finnish city of Pori.

Orbit and classification 

Pori is a member of the Eunomia family, a prominent family of stony asteroids and the largest one in the intermediate main belt with more than 5,000 members. It orbits the Sun in the central main belt at a distance of 2.2–3.2 AU once every 4 years and 4 months (1,594 days). Its orbit has an eccentricity of 0.19 and an inclination of 12° with respect to the ecliptic. The body's observation arc begins with its official discovery observation at Turku in October 1938.

Physical characteristics 

Pori is an assumed S-type asteroid which corresponds to the Eunomia family's overall spectral type.

Rotation period 

Several rotational lightcurves of Pori have been obtained from photometric observations since 2003.

In August 2003, photometric observations made by Robert Stephens at the Santana Observatory in California, gave a synodic rotation period of 3.36 hours. The lightcurve shows a brightness variation of 0.28 in magnitude. In August 2016, another lightcurve by Maurice Audejean gave a refined rotation period of 3.3557 hours with an amplitude of 0.34 magnitude.

Diameter and albedo 

According to the surveys carried out by the Japanese Akari satellite and the NEOWISE mission of NASA's Wide-field Infrared Survey Explorer, Pori measures between 13.37 and 14.90 kilometers in diameter and its surface has an albedo between 0.240 and 0.330.

The Collaborative Asteroid Lightcurve Link assumes a standard albedo of 0.21 – derived from 15 Eunomia, the largest member and namesake of the Eunomia family – and calculates a diameter of 15.22 kilometers based on an absolute magnitude of 11.4.

Naming 

This minor planet was named after the city of Pori, located near the Gulf of Bothnia in Finland. The official  was published by the Minor Planet Center on 20 February 1976.

References

External links 
 Asteroid Lightcurve Database (LCDB), query form (info )
 Dictionary of Minor Planet Names, Google books
 Asteroids and comets rotation curves, CdR – Observatoire de Genève, Raoul Behrend
 Discovery Circumstances: Numbered Minor Planets (1)-(5000) – Minor Planet Center
 
 

001499
Discoveries by Yrjö Väisälä
Named minor planets
19381016